Ludo Monset (7 October 1946 – 7 October 2018) was a Belgian politician representing Open VLD who served as a Senator from 1991 to 1995, and as Mayor of Blankenberge from 1995 to 2011.

References

1946 births
2018 deaths
Members of the Senate (Belgium)
Open Vlaamse Liberalen en Democraten politicians
Mayors of places in Belgium
People from Blankenberge